Frontiers in Physics is a peer-reviewed open-access scientific journal covering physics. It was established in 2013 and is published by Frontiers Media. The editor-in-chief is Alex Hansen (Norwegian University of Science and Technology). The scope of the journal covers the entire field of physics, from experimental, to computational and theoretical physics.

Abstracting and indexing
The journal is abstracted and indexed in Current Contents/Physical, Chemical & Earth Sciences, Science Citation Index Expanded, and Scopus. According to the Journal Citation Reports, the journal has a 2020 impact factor of 3.560.

References

External links
 

English-language journals
Physics journals
Publications established in 2013
Creative Commons-licensed journals
Frontiers Media academic journals